is  the former Head coach of the Renova Kagoshima in the Japanese NBDL.

Head coaching record

|-
| style="text-align:left;"|Renova Kagoshima
| style="text-align:left;"|2013-14
| 32||11||21|||| style="text-align:center;"|6th in NBDL|||-||-||-||
| style="text-align:center;"|-
|-
| style="text-align:left;"|Renova Kagoshima
| style="text-align:left;"|2014-15
| 32||5||27|||| style="text-align:center;"|8th in NBDL|||-||-||-||
| style="text-align:center;"|-
|-

References

1982 births
Living people
Akita Isuzu/Isuzu Motors Lynx/Giga Cats players
Ehime Orange Vikings players
Japanese basketball coaches
Kagoshima Rebnise coaches
Kagoshima Rebnise players